Pensiero d'amore (Italian for Thought of love) is a 1969 Italian "musicarello" film directed by Mario Amendola and starring Mal and Silvia Dionisio.

Plot

Cast 

 Mal as Reg 
 Silvia Dionisio as Paola 
 Stelvio Rosi as  Kurt 
 Angela Luce as  Stefania Varaldi  
 Francesco Mulè as  Sor Domenico 
 Carlo Delle Piane as  Ovidio 
 Gina Mascetti as  Miss Tibiletti 
 Pietro De Vico as  Enrico 
 Beatrice Bensi as  Gilda aka Paperona  
 Umberto D'Orsi as  Giovanni Tibiletti
 Pippo Franco as  Leone 
  Franco Allocca as  Gianluca 
 Fulvio Mingozzi as  Renzetti 
 Gianni Pulone as  TV Director
 Luca Sportelli as  Attore Toscano

References

External links

Musicarelli
1969 musical comedy films
Films directed by Mario Amendola
1969 films
1960s Italian-language films
1960s Italian films